Nancy Jane Dolman Short (September 26, 1951 – August 21, 2010) was a Canadian comedic actress and singer. She had a recurring role as Annie Selig Tate on the ABC sitcom Soap. She appeared in her husband Martin Short's 1985 cable television special Martin Short: Concert for the North Americas.

Life and career
Dolman was born in Toronto. Her brother is director Bob Dolman. Dolman performed in the Canadian Rock Theatre production of Jesus Christ Superstar in the early 1970s, which travelled to Las Vegas and Los Angeles, and recorded an album with the group at MGM while they were in Los Angeles.

In 1980, she married fellow Canadian actor Martin Short, whom she had met during the run of the 1972 Toronto production of Godspell.  Dolman was Gilda Radner's understudy. Dolman attended high school at York Mills Collegiate Institute in Toronto, and held a bachelor's degree in philosophy from the University of Western Ontario.

Dolman retired from show business in 1985 to be a homemaker and full-time mother to her children. A profile of the couple appeared in the February 1987 issue of Vogue. The family made their home in Pacific Palisades, California. Dolman and Short also kept a vacation home in Lake Rosseau, Ontario.

Children
Dolman and Short adopted three children: Katherine Elizabeth (born 1983), a social worker and graduate of New York University; Oliver Patrick (born 1986), an employee of Warner Brothers and graduate of the University of Notre Dame's Mendoza College of Business; and Henry Hayter (born 1989), who also graduated from the University of Notre Dame in May 2012.

Death
Dolman was suffering from ovarian cancer and died on August 21, 2010, in Pacific Palisades, California, at the age of 58. According to the Los Angeles County Coroner, she died of natural causes. Dolman's remains were cremated and her ashes were scattered from the dock of the Short family cottage, onto the waters of Lake Rosseau, Muskoka, Ontario, Canada.

Tributes

Steve Martin, a close friend of Dolman and Short, dedicated a musical elegy for Dolman following her death titled, "The Great Remember (For Nancy)" in his collaborative album, Rare Bird Alert with the Steep Canyon Rangers.

References

External links

Nancy Dolman at Godspell.ca

1951 births
2010 deaths
Canadian women comedians
Canadian expatriate actresses in the United States
Canadian musical theatre actresses
Canadian stage actresses
Canadian television actresses
Deaths from cancer in California
Deaths from ovarian cancer
Actresses from Toronto
Comedians from Toronto
Musicians from Toronto
University of Western Ontario alumni
20th-century Canadian actresses
20th-century Canadian women singers